Teletext (or "broadcast teletext") is a television information retrieval service developed in the United Kingdom in the early 1970s. It offers a range of text-based information, typically including national, international and sporting news, weather and TV schedules. Subtitle (or closed captioning) information is also transmitted in the teletext signal, typically on page 888 or 777.

A number of similar teletext services were developed in other countries, some of which attempted to address the limitations of the British-developed system, with its simple graphics and fixed page sizes.

This is an incomplete list of teletext services available on different television channels around the world:

Countries with functioning teletext services

Albania
 Top-Channel
 TVSH
 Mediaset
 RAI

Austria

 ORF Text (ORF1, ORF2, ORF3)
 ORF Sport Text (ORF Sport Plus)
 TW1 Text (TW1)
 3satText (3sat)
 ATV TEXT (ATV)
 Puls 4 Text (Puls 4)
 Sat1 Österreich Text (Sat 1 Österreich)
 ProSieben Text Austria (Pro 7 Österreich)
 kabel eins text Austria (Kabel 1 Österreich)
 RTLtext AT (RTL Österreich)
 RTL II TEXT AT (RTL 2)
 Austria 9 Text (Austria 9)

Belgium

Available via DVB-T 
 RTBF-Teletexte (RTBF)

Defunct service 
 VRT-Teletekst (VRT. Service ended 1 June 2016)

Bosnia and Herzegovina
 BHT1 Text (BHT1) - main state level public TV channel in Bosnia and Herzegovina
 FTV Text (FTV) - entity level public TV channel
 RTRS Text (RTRS) - entity level public TV channel

Croatia
 HTV TTXT (Croatian Radiotelevision)
 Nova Text (Nova TV)
 RTL Text (RTL Televizija)

Czech Republic
 Teletext ČT
 Teletext Nova
 Prima Teletext
 Prima Cool Teletext
 Prima Love Teletext
 Teletext TV Óčko
 Teletext TV Barrandov

Denmark
 DR Tekst-TV (Danmarks Radio)
 TV2 Tekst-TV (TV2 Adopted digital teletext, but abandoned the service in 2019)
 Viasat Tekst-TV (Viasat)

In fact, almost all TV channels in Denmark have teletext (called tekst-TV). Some of those services are entirely in Danish, while international channels (Discovery Channel, Animal Planet etc.) share their teletext with the other Scandinavian countries.

Finland
The Finnish national public broadcaster Yle has its own Teletext (Yle Teksti-TV). It shows news, sport and programme information round the clock. Theme pages on the weather, traffic, work and leisure. Teksti-TV also has news in English on page 190.

 Yle Teksti-TV (Yle)
 MTV3 Tekstikanava (MTV3)
 TekstiNelonen (Nelonen) (subtitling only)
 Subteksti (Sub) (defunct)

France

In France, where the SECAM standard is used in television broadcasting, a teletext system was developed in the late 1970s under the name Antiope. It had a higher data rate and was capable of dynamic page sizes, allowing more sophisticated graphics. It was phased out in favour of standard teletext in 1991.

A lot of French channels have teletext left only for subtitling. Here some with a complete text:

 TF1
 France 2
 France 3
 Canal+ (subtitles only)
 France 5
 Arte
 M6 (subtitles only)

Germany

Almost all German TV stations have teletext. Here is a small selection:
 ARD (and all regional broadcasters)
 ZDF: (ZDF, ZDFneo, ZDFinfo)
 ARD & ZDF: KiKa, Phoenix
 RTL Deutschland: (RTL, VOX, RTL II, ... and others)
 ProSiebenSat.1: (ProSieben, Sat.1, kabel eins, ... and others)
 Tele 5
 Sport1
 Welt
 ... and others

Greece
 NERIT (State television channels N1, N Sports)
 Mediatext (Mega Channel, Star Channel, Sports TV, Extra3)
 Newsphone Hellas (ANT1, Alpha TV, Alter Channel, MAD TV)
 Metromedia Group (Vergina, Nickelodeon, Rise, Smile, Nickelodeon Plus, Super TV Halkidiki, Ionian Channel, Atlas TV)

Hungary

 m1Text (m1)
 m2Text (m2)
 TV2 Text (TV2)
 Klub text (RTL Klub)
 Viasat 3 (Viasat 3)

Iceland
 RÚV textavarp (Icelandic public TV station RÚV) available to view at Textavarp.is

Ireland
 RTÉ Aertel (RTÉ One and RTÉ Two) Still available in "analogue" on Sky in January 2019. Provided in "digital" on Saorview,

Defunct services
 threetext (TV3, 2001 - 201?)
 Téacs TG4 (TG4) (1999 - 20??)

Italy
State-owned RAI launched its Teletext service, called Televideo, in 1984.
 Televideo (RAI)

Defunct services
MTV Video was active between 2000 and 2010, while "LA7 Video", the Teletext service of La7, was launched in 2001 but discontinued in 2014. Mediaset, the main commercial broadcaster, launched its Mediavideo Teletext in 1997 (discontinued in 2022).
 La7Video (La7)
 MTVVideo (MTV)
 Mediavideo (Mediaset)

Latvia
 TV3.lv (TV3 Latvia)

Defunct service
 Latvian Television used to have teletext, but as of March 2007, it is closed.

Luxembourg
 RTL Text (RTL Télé Lëtzebuerg)

Netherlands

The Netherlands has run a regular Teletext service since the end of 1977 on the public broadcasting channels, and the commercial and regional channels that were later introduced also have their own services. Some of these channels also run Tekst-TV, which broadcasts a selection of their teletext pages as a regular TV broadcast, using improved fonts and background graphics, when no normal programming is shown.

 NOS Teletekst (NPO 1, NPO 2 and NPO 3)
 Omroep Brabant
 Omrop Fryslân Text
 RTV Drenthe
 RTV Oost
 TV Gelderland Teletekst

Subtitling only
 RTL Nederland Text (RTL 4, RTL 5, RTL7 and RTL 8)
 SBS Text (NET5 Text, SBS6 Text, Veronica Text. Main teletext service ended 1 January 2018.)

Defunct service 
 Fox Sports (Ended 27 June 2019)

Norway
 Norwegian Broadcasting Corporation: NRK Tekst-TV
 TV 2: TV 2 Text
 TVNorge
 TV3

Pakistan
 PTV Teletext service

Poland

 Telegazeta (Telewizja Polska)
 Gazeta TV Polsat (Polsat)
 Gazeta TV4 (TV4)
 Telestrony (TVN)
 Mediatext 5 (Tele5)
 Mediatext 1P (Polonia 1)
 4fun.tv Text

Portugal

 RTP Texto (Rádio e Televisão de Portugal)
 SIC Teletexto (SIC)
 Teletexto TVI (TVI)

Romania
 Teletext TVR (TVR 1, TVR 2, TVR 3, TVRi)
 Pro Text (Pro TV, Pro 2, Pro Gold, Pro Cinema, Pro X, PRO TV Internațional)
 CNM Text (Național TV, Național 24 Plus, Favorit TV, CineEst, Boomerang, TV Market)
 Antena Group Teletext (Antena 1, Antena Stars, Antena 3, Happy Channel, ZU TV)

Russia

 Channel One
 Russia 1 (subtitles only)
 Match TV (subtitles only)
 NTV
 Channel 5
 Russia K (subtitles only)
 Karusel (subtitles only)
 REN TV (subtitles only)
 CENTR-INFO (TV Center)
 STS (subtitles only)
 Domashny (subtitles only)
 TV-3 (subtitles only)
 Friday! (subtitles only)
 Zvezda (subtitles only)
 TNT (subtitles only)
 2x2 (subtitles only)
 Mir (subtitles only)
 Soyuz (subtitles only)
 Che! (subtitles only)
 STS LOVE (subtitles only)
 TNT4 (subtitles only)
 Kuhnya TV (subtitles only)
 Auto Plus (subtitles only)
 Animal Planet (subtitles only)
 Nickelodeon (subtitles only)
 IZ.RU (subtitles only)
 Muzika Pervogo (subtitles only)
 Super! (subtitles only)
 Match! Strana (subtitles only)

Defunct services
 1 kanal Ostankino
 ORT
 4 kanal Ostankino
 Rossiskije University
 RTR
 MTV Russia (2006-2008)
 2x2
 Russia-Kuban
 Peterburgksiy teletext (TNT-Peterburg, Peterburg - 5 kanal, Regionalnoe televidenie)
 Sevastopolskiy teletext (NTS)
 Nizhegorodskiy teletext (NTR, NNTV, ORT)
 Prima-TV
 Stolitca
 31 kanal
 TV-6
 MTK
 Sluzhba Teletext (M1)

Serbia
 TeletextB92 (B92)
 Prva Teletekst (Prva Srpska Televizija)
 Happy teletext Happy TV
 Pink Teletekst (RTV Pink)
 RTS Teletekst (RTS1, RTS2)
 RTV Teletekst (RTV1 RTV2)
 Sport Klub TXT
 RTV Studio B TXT
 Arena Sport Teletext (Arena Sport 1)

Defunct services
 BK Videotext (BKTV)
 Super TV Teletext (Super TV)
 Enter Teletext (TV Enter)
 3K Text (RTS 3K)
 Avala text (Avala)

Slovakia
STV text (Slovenská televízia)
markiza-text (Markíza)
JOJ text (TV JOJ)

South Africa
 Teledata (only available on SABC 2; rarely updated)

Spain

 Teletexto RTVE (Televisión Española) (Since 1988)
 Teletexto de Antena 3 Televisión Antena 3 teletext
 Cuatro teletext
 Telecinco teletext
 Teletexto de La Sexta Televisión (laSexta)
 Televisió de Catalunya Catalan public television

Defunct services
 Telemadrid (1991-2013)
 Teletexto TVG (Televisión de Galicia - 1995–2018)

Sweden
 SVT Text (Sveriges Television)

Defunct services
 Kanal 5 Text (Kanal 5)
 TV3 Text (TV3)
 TV6 Text (TV6)
 TV4 Text (TV4)

Switzerland

 TELETEXT (Made by SWISS TXT for all national TV stations, including SF, TSR and TSI).
 3+ TEXT (3+)
 RTL II TEXT CH(RTL 2)
 SSF TEXT (Schweizer Sportfernsehen)

Turkey
 Telegün (TRT) The Teletext is available online at (Telegün)

Defunct services
 D Text (Kanal D)
 ShowText (Show TV)
 Start Text (Star TV)
 AText (ATV)

Ukraine
 INTERTEXT (The Teletext on Inter Media Group TV channels, also is available on-line at Інтертекст)

Vietnam
DN2-Asia first Vietnamese language teletext

Countries with no teletext services

Worldwide
 BBCfax (BBC World), 1991–2012)
 CNN text (CNN), 1993–2006)
 TV5 text (TV5Monde), 1993–2013)

Australia
 Austext (Seven Network) (1982–30 September 2009)

Belarus 
 Beltek (Belarus-1) (defunct from 2008)

Bulgaria
 Televest (BNT 1) (defunct since 2017)
 Evrokom text (Evrokom NKTV) (defunct)
 Nova text (Nova TV) (defunct since 2012)

Canada

The CBC ran a teletext service, IRIS, accessible only in Calgary, Toronto and Montreal. It ran from 1983 until about 1986, and used the Canadian-developed Telidon system, which was developed in 1980. Like Antiope, Telidon allowed significantly higher graphic resolution than standard teletext.

Estonia
 ETV teletekst (Eesti Televisioon) (defunct)
 TV3.ee (TV3 Estonia) (defunct)

Indonesia
 TVRI-Text (TVRI, 1995 - 1999)
 RCTI Seputar (RCTI, 1997 - 1999)

Israel
 Israeli Educational Television

Japan
Telemo Japan (NHK)
TV Asahi Data Vision (TV Asahi) (7 April 1986 – 24 July 2011)
AXES4 (Nippon TV) (1985-31 March 2007)
Tokyo Data Vision (TBS)
Fuji TV
Tokyo Metropolitan Television
Nikkei Telepress (TV Tokyo)

Malaysia
 Beriteks (RTM) (1985-2000)
 Infonet (TV3)  (1985-2008)

New Zealand
 TVNZ Teletext (TVNZ 1, TVNZ 2, TV3) (1984–2 April 2013)

Singapore
 MediaCorp Teletext (MediaCorp TV Channel 5, MediaCorp TV Channel 8, MediaCorp Channel NewsAsia) (1 August 1983 – 30 September 2013)

Thailand
 "ข่าวเขียน อสมท" Or Electronic News (Modernine TV) (1983-1993)
 "Infonet" (Channel 3 (Thailand)) (Known up until 1996 as ข่าวเขียน ช่อง 3)

United Kingdom

Teletext was created in the United Kingdom in the early 1970s. Different systems existed, but by the end of the decade they converged, with the creation of the World System Teletext (WST). WST remained in use for analogue broadcasts until 2012.

Ceefax 

The first test transmissions were made by the BBC in 1972–74, with the name Ceefax ("see facts"). The Ceefax system went live on 23 September 1974 with thirty pages of information. Due to the adoption of a common teletext standard (WST), the Ceefax system ceased in 1976. The name was retained for the service itself, that continued after that year using the WST standard.

Oracle 

ORACLE was first broadcast on the ITV network in the mid-late 1970s. Due to the adoption of a common teletext standard (WST), the ORACLE system ceased in 1976. The name was retained for the service itself, that continued after that year using the WST standard.

United States
 AgText (Kentucky Educational Television, 1980s–1998)
Datavizion (WHA-TV/Discovery Channel, 1980s)
Electra (WKRC-TV/Superstation WTBS/SPN, 1980s–1993)
 ExtraVision (CBS, 1983–1986)
Infotext (WHA-TV/Discovery Channel, 1980s)
KeyFax (WTBS/WFLD-TV, 1980s)
 NBC Teletext (NBC, 1983–1985)
Tempo Text (WTBS/SPN, 1980s–1993)
Time Teletext (1980s)

United States 

Adoption in the United States was hampered due to a lack of a single teletext standard and consumer resistance to the high initial price of teletext decoders. Throughout the period of analogue broadcasting, teletext or other similar technologies in the US were practically non-existent, with the only technologies resembling such existing in the country being closed captioning, TV Guide On Screen, and Extended Data Services (XDS).

A version of the European teletext standard designed to work with the NTSC television standard used in North America was first demonstrated in the US in 1978 by station KSL in Salt Lake City, Utah, premiered a teletext service using Ceefax.  They were followed by American television network CBS, which decided to try both the British Ceefax and French Antiope software for preliminary tryouts for a teletext service, using station KMOX (now KMOV) in St. Louis, Missouri as a testing ground.

CBS decided on Antiope and mounted a large market trial in Los Angeles in partnership with NBC and Public Broadcasting Service (PBS) Public television. Services premiered simultaneously on station KNXT (now KCBS-TV), KNBC and KCET in Los Angeles. All three services included an array of local news and information services. KCET's service also included service components for use in schools.

NABTS 

Later, an official North American standard of teletext, called NABTS (North American Broadcast Teletext Specification) was developed in the early 1980s by Norpak, a Canadian company. NABTS provided improved graphic and text capability over WST, but was quite short-lived. This was mainly due to the expensive cost of NABTS decoders, costing in the thousands of dollars upon their release to the public. NABTS, however, was adopted for a short while by American TV networks NBC & CBS throughout the early-to-mid 80s, CBS using it for their short-lived ExtraVision teletext service, which premiered after the early Antiope & Ceefax trials by CBS & KNXT, and NBC, who had a NABTS-based service called NBC Teletext for a very short time in the mid-1980s. NBC discontinued their service in 1985 due to the cost of NABTS decoders not dropping to an affordable level for the consumer public.

The NABTS protocol received a revival of sorts in the late 90s, when it was used for the datacasting features of WebTV for Windows under Windows 98, and for Intel's now-defunct InterCast service (also for Windows as well), using a proper TV tuner card (such as the ATI All-In-Wonder or Hauppauge's Win-TV).

1990s: InterCast 

InterCast was a modern teletext-like system created by Intel in 1996, using a TV tuner card installed in a desktop PC running Windows with the InterCast Viewer software. The software would receive data representing HTML pages via the VBI (Vertical Blanking Interval) of a television channel's video, while displaying in a window in the InterCast software the TV channel itself. The HTML data received would then be displayed in another window in the Intercast software. It usually was extra supplemental information relevant to the TV program being viewed, such as extra clues for the viewer during a murder mystery show, or extra news headlines or extended weather forecasts during a newscast.

NBC, as well as The Weather Channel, CNN and M2 (now MTV2), utilized InterCast technology to complement their programming. InterCast, however, fell into disuse, and Intel discontinued support of InterCast a few years later.

WaveTop 

Another service in the US similar in delivery and content to teletext was the WaveTop service, provided and operated by the Wavephore Corporation. It used the same types of InterCast-compatible TV tuner cards, and used an application that ran under Windows, like InterCast. In fact, WaveTop software was also bundled with TV tuner cards that had InterCast software bundled with them as well.

However, Wavetop was an independent service from InterCast, and wasn't a complementary service to a television program or channel like the latter. In fact, viewing television with a TV card was not possible while the WaveTop software was running, since the software utilized the TV tuner card as a full-time data receiver.

WaveTop provided content from several different providers in the form of HTML pages displayed in the WaveTop software, such as news articles from the New York Times, weather information provided by The Weather Channel, and sports from ESPN. It also delivered short video clips, usually commercials, that could be viewed in the software as well.

When it was in operation, WaveTop's data was delivered on the VBI of local public TV stations affiliated with PBS through their PBS National Datacast division, that the WaveTop software tuned the TV card to in order to receive the service.

Guide+

Yet another service in the U.S. that relied on data delivery via the VBI like teletext, was the Guide+ (Guide Plus, also referred to as GuidePlus+ as well) service provided and developed by Gemstar. There were several models of television sets made throughout the 90s by Thomson Consumer Electronics under the RCA and General Electric brands that had built-in Guide+ decoders. Guide+ was an on-screen interactive program guide that provided current TV schedule listings, as well as other information like news headlines. Some Guide+ equipped sets from RCA even had an IR-emitting sensor that could be plugged into the back of the TV, to control a VCR to record programs which could be selected from the on-screen Guide+ listings. In some ways, this was very similar to the Video Programming by Teletext|Video Programming by Teletext (VPT), Video Program System (VPS), and Programme Delivery Control (PDC) features of British/European teletext.

Guide+ was a free service, supported by advertisements displayed on-screen in the Guide+ menu and listing screens, not unlike banner ads displayed on web pages. Guide+ was delivered over the VBI of select local American TV stations.

Guide+ was discontinued by Gemstar in June 2004, and soon afterwards, Thomson dropped the Guide+ features from all RCA and GE television sets made afterward.

However, Guide+ in the United States has now been replaced by Gemstar with a similar service (delivered in the same fashion via VBI like Guide+), called TV Guide On Screen. A small number of televisions, DVD recorders, and digital video recorders are now being released with TV Guide On Screen capabilities. The Guide+ name & service is still used in Europe by Gemstar. (The same service is known in Japan as G-Guide).

Star Sight
Similar to Guide+ was Star Sight, with its decoders built into TVs manufactured by Zenith, Samsung, Sony, Toshiba, Magnavox, and others. This was an electronic program guide service similar to Guide+, but was a service that relied on monthly subscription fees paid by the user, not from revenue gathered from on-screen advertisements like Guide+. Star Sight discontinued operations on 21 July 2003, due to a lack of subscribers to the service. Star Sight's data was also delivered on the VBI of local PBS stations through the PBS National Datacast division, much like how WaveTop was delivered as mentioned previously in this article.

International

World System Teletext 

World System Teletext (or WST) is the name of a standard for teletext throughout Europe today.
Almost all television sets sold in Europe since the early ’80s have built-in WST-standard teletext decoders as a feature.

It originally stems from the UK standards developed by the BBC (Ceefax) and the UK Independent Broadcasting Authority (ORACLE) in 1974 for teletext transmission, extended in 1976 as the Broadcast Teletext Specification.

With some tweaks to allow for alternative national character sets, and adaptations to the NTSC 525-line system as necessary, this was then promoted internationally as "World System Teletext".

It was accepted by CCIR in 1986 as CCIR Teletext System B, one of four recognised standards for teletext worldwide.

WST was also used for a short time in the US, with services provided throughout the late 1970s and early 1980s by several regional American TV networks (such as the University of Wisconsin–Madison's Infotext service in the mid-1980s, which was carried on several TV stations across Wisconsin, and Agtext, provided by Kentucky Educational Television and carried on KET's stations, both services providing agriculturally oriented information) and major-market U.S. TV stations (such as Metrotext, which was formerly carried on station KTTV in Los Angeles, and KeyFax, formerly on WFLD in Chicago).

Perhaps the most prominent of American teletext providers was the Electra teletext service, using WST, which was broadcast starting in the early 1980s on the vertical blanking interval (VBI) of the American cable channel WTBS. Electra was owned and operated by Taft Broadcasting and Satellite Syndicated Systems (SSS). Electra ran up until 1993, when it was shut down due to Zenith, the prominent (and only) American TV manufacturer at the time offering teletext features in their sets decided to discontinue such features, as well as a lack of funding and lagging interest in teletext by the American consumer.

Zenith manufactured models of television sets in the US in the 1980s, most notably their Digital System 3 line, that had built-in WST teletext decoders as a feature, much like most British/European TV sets. Teletext services in the US like Electra could be received with one of these sets, but these were mostly more expensive higher-end sets offered by Zenith, possibly causing Electra (and American teletext in general) to never catch on with the public.

Australian company Dick Smith Electronics (DSE) also offered through their US distributors a set-top WST teletext decoder kit. The kit used as its core the same teletext decoding module (manufactured by UK electronics company Mullard) installed in most British TV sets, with additional circuitry to adapt it for American NTSC video, and to utilize it in a separate set-top box.

A significant reason for the demise of American teletext was when Zenith introduced built-in closed captioning decoders in TVs in the early '90s, as mandated by the FCC. It was not practical for Zenith to re-design their TV chassis models that previously had teletext decoder support to have both teletext and closed captioning support. So Zenith decided to drop the teletext features, therefore ending teletext service in the US in the early 1990s, considering Zenith was the only major manufacturer of teletext-equipped sets in the United States.

References